This list of the prehistoric life of Texas contains the various prehistoric life-forms whose fossilized remains have been reported from within the US state of Texas.

Precambrian
The Paleobiology Database records no known occurrences of Precambrian fossils in Texas

Paleozoic

Selected Paleozoic taxa of Texas

  †Acheloma – type locality for genus
 †Acheloma cumminsi – type locality for species
 †Achistrum
 †Achistrum ludwigi – type locality for species
  †Acrodus – tentative report
 †Acrodus olsoni – type locality for species
 †Acrodus sweetlacruzensis – type locality for species
 †Actinoconchus
 †Acutichiton
 †Adamantina
 †Adrianites – tentative report
 †Agathiceras
 †Agathiceras applini – type locality for species
 †Alegeinosaurus
 †Alethopteris
 †Almites
 †Altudoceras
 †Alveus – type locality for genus
 †Amphiscapha
 †Amplexus – report made of unidentified related form or using admittedly obsolete nomenclature
  Amusium – tentative report
 †Ananias
 †Anatsabites
 †Angelosaurus – type locality for genus
 †Angelosaurus dolani – type locality for species
 †Anisodexis
 †Annularia
 †Annularia stellata – or unidentified comparable form
 †Anomalesia
 †Anomphalus
 †Aphetoceras
 †Aphlebia
  †Apsisaurus – type locality for genus
 †Apsisaurus witteri – type locality for species
  †Araeoscelis – type locality for genus
 †Archaeocidaris
 Archaeolithophyllum
  †Archeria – type locality for genus
 †Archeria crassidisca – type locality for species
 †Archimedes
 †Arcuolimbus
 †Aristoceras
 †Armenoceras
 †Artisia
 †Aspidosaurus – type locality for genus
 †Athyris
 †Aulopora – report made of unidentified related form or using admittedly obsolete nomenclature
  †Aviculopecten
 †Aviculopecten ballingerana
 †Aviculopecten girtyi – type locality for species
 †Aviculopecten gryphus – type locality for species
 †Aviculopecten occidentalis
 †Aviculopecten sumnerensis
 †Avonia
 †Barnesoceras – type locality for genus
 †Bathyglyptus – type locality for genus
  †Bellerophon – tentative report
 †Bellerophon
 †Bellerophon graphicus
 †Bembexia
 †Bitaunioceras
 †Blountiella
  †Bolosaurus – type locality for genus
 †Bolosaurus major – type locality for species
 †Bolosaurus striatus – type locality for species
 †Brachydectes
 †Brachyphyllum – tentative report
 †Branneroceras
 †Broiliellus – type locality for genus
 †Broiliellus brevis – type locality for species
 †Broiliellus olsoni – type locality for species
 †Broiliellus texensis – type locality for species
 †Burenoceras
  †Cacops
 †Cacops aspidephorus – type locality for species
 †Calamites
 †Calamites undulatus
 †Callipteridium
 †Callipteris
 †Callipteris conferta
 †Calophyllum – tentative report
 †Camarotoechia
  †Captorhinus – type locality for genus
 †Captorhinus aguti – type locality for species
 †Carbonicola
 †Cardiocephalus – type locality for genus
 †Cardiocephalus sternbergi – type locality for species
 †Carrolla – type locality for genus
  †Casea – type locality for genus
 †Casea broilii – type locality for species
 †Caseoides – type locality for genus
 †Caseopsis
 †Cassiavellia – type locality for genus
 †Cassiavellia galtarae – type locality for species
  †Catenipora
 †Cedaria
  †Chancelloria – tentative report
 †Chonetes
 †Chonetes flemingi – tentative report
 †Chonetes verneuilianus
 †Cibolites – type locality for genus
 †Clarkoceras
  †Cleiothyridina
 †Cleiothyridina mulsa
 †Cleiothyridina nana
 †Cleiothyridina pilularis
 †Cleiothyridina rara
 †Cleiothyridina rectimarginata – type locality for species
  †Climacograptus
 †Clitendoceras
 †Clonograptus
 †Coenocystis – type locality for genus
 †Collemataria – type locality for genus
  †Composita
 †Composita affinis
 †Composita apheles – type locality for species
 †Composita apsidata
 †Composita bucculenta – type locality for species
 †Composita costata
 †Composita cracens
 †Composita crassa – type locality for species
 †Composita discina
 †Composita emarginata
 †Composita enormis – type locality for species
 †Composita imbricata – type locality for species
 †Composita mexicana
 †Composita mira
 †Composita nucella
 †Composita ovata
 †Composita parasulcata – type locality for species
 †Composita pilula
 †Composita prospera
 †Composita pyriformis
 †Composita quantilla
 †Composita stalagmium
 †Composita strongyle – type locality for species
 †Composita subcircularis
 †Composita subtilita
 †Conjunctio
 †Conocardium – tentative report
 †Cooperoceras – type locality for genus
 †Coosella
 †Coosia
  †Cordaites
 †Cordaites principalis
 †Cotteroceras
  †Cotylorhynchus
 †Cotylorhynchus hancocki – type locality for species
 Crania
 †Cravenoceras – tentative report
  †Cricotus
 †Crossotelos
 †Ctenacanthus
 †Ctenacanthus amblyxiphias – type locality for species
  †Ctenospondylus – type locality for genus
 †Cylicioscapha
 †Cypricardinia – tentative report
 †Cyptendoceras
 †Cystothalamia – type locality for genus
 †Cystothalamia megacysta
 †Cystothalamia nodulifera
  †Dadoxylon
 †Dakeoceras – tentative report
  †Dasyceps
 †Deiracephalus
 Dentalium
  †Diadectes – type locality for genus
 †Dimacrodon – type locality for genus
   †Dimetrodon – type locality for genus
 †Dimetrodon booneorum – type locality for species
 †Dimetrodon dollovianus – type locality for species
 †Dimetrodon gigashomogenes – type locality for species
 †Dimetrodon grandis – type locality for species
 †Dimetrodon kempae – type locality for species
 †Dimetrodon limbatus – type locality for species
 †Dimetrodon loomisi – type locality for species
 †Dimetrodon macrospondylus – type locality for species
 †Dimetrodon milleri – type locality for species
 †Dimetrodon natalis – type locality for species
  †Diplocaulus – type locality for genus
 †Diplocaulus magnicornis – type locality for species
 †Diraphora
 †Dissorophus – type locality for genus
 †Dissorophus multicinctus – type locality for species
 †Domatoceras
 †Driveria – type locality for genus
 †Echinaria
 †Ectenolites
  †Edaphosaurus – type locality for genus
 †Edaphosaurus boanerges
 †Edaphosaurus cruciger – or unidentified related form
 †Edaphosaurus pogonias – type locality for species
 †Edestus
 †Edmondia
  †Edops
 †Edops craigi
 †Ellesmeroceras
 †Empedias
  †Endoceras
 †Endolobus
 Eocaudina
 †Eosyodon – type locality for genus
  †Eothyris – type locality for genus
 †Eothyris parkeyi – type locality for species
 †Eowellerites
 †Epiphyton
 †error
 †Error
  †Eryops – type locality for genus
 †Eryops megacephalus – type locality for species
 †Estheria
 †Euomphalus
 †Euryodus – type locality for genus
 †Euryodus primus – type locality for species
 †Exovasa – type locality for genus
 †Exovasa cystauletoides – type locality for species
 †Fenestella
 †Fusulina – report made of unidentified related form or using admittedly obsolete nomenclature
 †Gastrioceras
 †Geinitzina
 †Genevievella
 †Geragnostus
  †Gerobatrachus – type locality for genus
 †Gerobatrachus hottoni – type locality for species
 †Gervillia – report made of unidentified related form or using admittedly obsolete nomenclature
 †Girvanella
 †Glaucosaurus – type locality for genus
 †Glaucosaurus megalops – type locality for species
  †Glikmanius
 †Glikmanius occidentalis
  †Gnathorhiza
 †Goniatites
 †Gorgodon – type locality for genus
 †Gorgodon minutus – type locality for species
  †Grewingkia
 †Guadalupia
 †Guadalupia auricula – type locality for species
 †Guadalupia cupulosa – type locality for species
 †Guadalupia microcamera – type locality for species
 †Guadalupia ramescens – type locality for species
 †Guadalupia vasa – type locality for species
 †Gypospirifer – type locality for genus
 †Gypospirifer condor
 †Helicoconchus – type locality for genus
  †Helicoprion
 †Helicoprion davisii
 †Helminthochiton
 †Hercosestria
 †Hoffmannia – report made of unidentified related form or using admittedly obsolete nomenclature
 †Homagnostus
 †Hybodus
 †Hypseloconus
 †Icriodus
 †Incisimura – type locality for genus
 †Incisimura bella – type locality for species
  †Isodectes
 †Isogramma
 †Janassa
 †Jeffersonia
 †Jinogondolella
 †Kingstonia
 †Knoxosaurus – type locality for genus
 †Kockelella
 †Komia
  †Labidosaurikos
 †Labidosaurus
 †Lambeoceras
 †Lepidophyllum
 †Levisoceras
 †Limbella
 Lingula
 †Liroceras
 †Llanoaspis
  †Lysorophus
 †Martinia
 †Mastersonia – type locality for genus
 †Mcqueenoceras
 †Metacoceras
 †Metalegoceras
 †Meteoraspis
 †Metoptoma
 †Michelinoceras – tentative report
  †Micraroter – tentative report
 †Micraroter erythrogeios
 †Microbaltoceras – type locality for genus
 †Minilya
 †Murchisonia
  †Mycterosaurus – type locality for genus
 †Mycterosaurus longiceps – type locality for species
 †Nanobamus – type locality for genus
  †Naticopsis
 †Naticopsis judithae
 †Naticopsis remex
 †Naticopsis transversa – type locality for species
 †Neldasaurus
 †Neoaganides
 †Neocalamites – or unidentified comparable form
  †Neospirifer
 †Neospirifer amphigyus – type locality for species
 †Neospirifer apothescelus – type locality for species
 †Neospirifer bakeri – type locality for species
 †Neospirifer cameratus – tentative report
 †Neospirifer formulosus
 †Neospirifer huecoensis – type locality for species
 †Neospirifer kansasensis
 †Neospirifer mansuetus
 †Neospirifer neali
 †Neospirifer notialis
 †Neospirifer placidus
 †Neospirifer triplicatus
 †Neospirifer venezuelensis
  †Neuropteris
 †Neuropteris cordata – tentative report
 †Nielsenoceras
 †Norwoodia
 Nucula – report made of unidentified related form or using admittedly obsolete nomenclature
 †Nybyoceras
 †Olenus
  †Ophiacodon – type locality for genus
 †Ophiacodon major – type locality for species
 †Ophiacodon retroversus – type locality for species
 †Ophiacodon uniformis – type locality for species
 †Ormoceras
  †Orodus
 †Orthacanthus
 †Ostodolepis – type locality for genus
 †Oulodus
 †Ozarkodina
 †Pachylyroceras
 †Paladin
 †Palaeoniscus – tentative report
  †Pantylus – type locality for genus
 †Pantylus cordatus – type locality for species
  †Paraceltites
 †Parafusulina
 †Paralegoceras
 †Paraschwagerina
 †Pariotichus – type locality for genus
 †Parioxys – type locality for genus
 Patella – tentative report
  †Pecopteris
 †Pecopteris arborescens
 †Pecopteris hemitelioides
 †Pecopteris unita
 †Pedanochiton – type locality for genus
 †Pelodosotis – type locality for genus
 †Pelodosotis elongatum – type locality for species
 †Peripetoceras
 †Petalodus
 †Phlegethontia – tentative report
 †Phonerpeton
 †Phonerpeton pricei – type locality for species
 †Pinnularia
 †Plaesiomys
 †Plagiostoma – report made of unidentified related form or using admittedly obsolete nomenclature
 †Platyceras
  †Platyhystrix – or unidentified comparable form
 †Plectronoceras
 †Pleuronautilus
 Pleurotomaria – report made of unidentified related form or using admittedly obsolete nomenclature
 †Plicochonetes
 †Posidonia
 Priscopedatus
 †Prodentalium
 †Prostacheoceras
 †Prostacheoceras skinneri – type locality for species
 †Protocaptorhinus – type locality for genus
 †Protocaptorhinus pricei – type locality for species
 †Protorothyris – type locality for genus
 †Protorothyris archeri – type locality for species
  †Psaronius
 †Pseudomelania – report made of unidentified related form or using admittedly obsolete nomenclature
 Pteria – report made of unidentified related form or using admittedly obsolete nomenclature
 †Pterochiton
 †Pugnax
 †Quadratia
 †Quasicaecilia – type locality for genus
 †Rananasus
 †Rayonnoceras
 †Reiszorhinus – type locality for genus
 †Retaria – report made of unidentified related form or using admittedly obsolete nomenclature
 †Rhabdiferoceras
  †Rhynchonella – report made of unidentified related form or using admittedly obsolete nomenclature
 †Ribeiria
 †Rioceras
 †Romeria – type locality for genus
 †Romeria prima – type locality for species
 †Romeria texana – type locality for species
 †Rota
  †Rubeostratilia – type locality for genus
 †Rugaria
 †Ruthenoceras – report made of unidentified related form or using admittedly obsolete nomenclature
 †Sagenodus
 †Sallya
 †Samaropsis
 †Sauropleura
 †Scapanops – type locality for genus
 †Scapanops neglecta – type locality for species
 †Schwagerina
  †Secodontosaurus
 †Secodontosaurus obtusidens – type locality for species
 Serpula – tentative report
  †Seymouria – type locality for genus
 †Seymouria baylorensis – type locality for species
 †Shouchangoceras
 †Sigillaria
 †Sigillaria brardii
 †Slaugenhopia – type locality for genus
 Solemya – tentative report
 †Solenochilus
 †Solenopora
 †Spermatodus
  †Sphenacanthus
  †Sphenophyllum
 †Sphenophyllum oblongifolium
 †Sphenopteris
 †Spica
 †Spirifer
 †Spirifer rockymontanus
 Spirorbis
 †Stearoceras
 †Steppesaurus – type locality for genus
 †Stereophallodon – type locality for genus
 †Stereophallodon ciscoensis – type locality for species
  †Stethacanthus
 †Strepsodiscus
 †Strophomena
 †Strophomena neglecta
 †Syringopora – tentative report
 †Tainoceras
 †Tappenosaurus – type locality for genus
 †Tappenosaurus magnus – type locality for species
 †Tarphyceras
  †Terebratula – report made of unidentified related form or using admittedly obsolete nomenclature
 †Tersomius – type locality for genus
 †Tersomius texensis – type locality for species
 †Tesnusocaris – type locality for genus
 †Tesnusocaris goldichi – type locality for species
  †Tetraceratops – type locality for genus
 †Tetraceratops insignis – type locality for species
 †Tetrataxis
 †Texoceras
 †Trichasaurus – type locality for genus
 †Trichasaurus texensis – type locality for species
 †Tricrepicephalus
  †Trimerorhachis
 †Trimerorhachis greggi – type locality for species
 †Trimerorhachis insignis – type locality for species
 †Triproetus
 Trochus – report made of unidentified related form or using admittedly obsolete nomenclature
 †Tunstallia – report made of unidentified related form or using admittedly obsolete nomenclature
 Turbo – report made of unidentified related form or using admittedly obsolete nomenclature
 †Varanops
 †Varanops brevirostris – type locality for species
  †Varanosaurus – type locality for genus
 †Varanosaurus acutirostris – type locality for species
 †Vidria
 †Waagenina
 †Waagenoceras
 †Waggoneria – type locality for genus
  †Walchia
 †Wattia – type locality for genus
 †Wilkingia
 †Worthenia
 †Wurmiella
 †Wurmiella excavata
 †Xenacanthus
 †Xyloiulus – tentative report
 Yoldia – tentative report
  †Zatrachys

Mesozoic

Selected Mesozoic taxa of Texas

  †Acanthoceras
 †Acanthoceras adkinsi
 †Acanthoceras amphibolum
 †Acanthoceras barcusi
 †Acanthoceras eulessanum
 †Acanthoceras johnsonanum
 †Acanthoceras tarrantense
 †Acanthoceras wintoni
 †Acanthoceras worthense
 Acesta
 Acirsa
 Acmaea
 †Acompsoceras
  †Acrocanthosaurus
 †Acrocanthosaurus atokensis
 Acteon
 †Acteonella
  †Adelobasileus – type locality for genus
 †Adelobasileus cromptoni – type locality for species
 †Adkinsia
 †Adocus
 †Aenona
 †Aetodactylus – type locality for genus
 †Aetodactylus halli – type locality for species
 †Agerostrea
 †Agujaceratops
 †Agujaceratops mariscalensis – type locality for species
 †Akera
  †Alamosaurus
 †Alamosaurus sanjuanensis
 †Albanerpeton
 †Albanerpeton gracilis
 †Albanerpeton nexuosus
 †Allocrioceras
 Alnus
  †Alphadon
 †Alphadon halleyi – or unidentified comparable form
 †Ampullina – or unidentified comparable form
 Amusium
 †Anaklinoceras
 †Ancilla
  †Angistorhinus
 †Angistorhinus grandis
 †Angulomastacator – type locality for genus
 †Angulomastacator daviesi – type locality for species
 †Anisoceras
 Anomia
 †Anomoeodus
 †Anomotodon
 †Apachesaurus
 †Apachesaurus gregorii
 Arca
 Architectonica
  †Arganodus
 †Arganodus dorotheae – type locality for species
 Arrhoges
 †Aspidoceras
 Astarte
 Astrangia
 Astreopora – tentative report
 †Astroconodon – type locality for genus
 †Astroconodon denisoni – type locality for species
  †Astrodon
 †Astrodon johnstoni
 †Astrophocaudia – type locality for genus
 †Astrophocaudia slaughteri – type locality for species
 †Axonoceras
  †Baculites
 †Baculites aquilaensis - or unidentified loosely related form
 †Baculites haresi – or unidentified comparable form
 †Baculites ovatus
 †Baculites scotti
 †Baculites tippahensis
 †Baena – report made of unidentified related form or using admittedly obsolete nomenclature
 †Banis
 Barbatia – tentative report
 †Barroisiceras
  †Basilemys
 †Belemnitella
 †Belemnitella americana
 †Belodon
 †Belonostomus
  †Bernissartia – tentative report
 †Betelgeusia – type locality for genus
 †Betelgeusia reidi – type locality for species
 †Bostrychoceras
 Botula
 †Botula carolinensis
 †Botula conchafodentis
  †Brachauchenius
 †Brachauchenius lucasi
 Brachidontes
 †Brachychampsa
  †Brachysuchus – type locality for genus
 †Brachysuchus megalodon – type locality for species
 †Bravoceratops – type locality for genus
 †Bravoceratops polyphemus – type locality for species
  †Brontopodus – type locality for genus
 Busycon – tentative report
 Cadulus
 Caestocorbula
 †Caestocorbula crassaplica
 †Caestocorbula crassiplica
 †Caestocorbula suffalciata
 †Caestocorbula terramaria
 Callianassa
 †Calliomphalus
 †Calliomphalus americanus
 †Calyptosuchus – type locality for genus
 †Calyptosuchus wellesi – type locality for species
  Calyptraea
 Cancellaria
 Cantharus – tentative report
  †Caprina
 Capulus
 Carcharias
 †Caririchnium
 Carota
 Caryophyllia
 †Caseosaurus – type locality for genus
 †Caseosaurus crosbyensis – type locality for species
 †Casierius
 †Catactegenys – type locality for genus
  †Caturus
 †Caveola
 †Cedarosaurus
 †Cedarosaurus weiskopfae
  †Ceratodus
 Cerithiella
 †Cerithiella nodoliratum – or unidentified related form
 †Cerithiella semirugatum
 Cerithium
 †Chamops
 †Champsosaurus
  †Chindesaurus
 †Chindesaurus bryansmalli
 †Chinlea
 †Chirostenotes
 †Chupacabrachelys – type locality for genus
 Cidaris
 †Cimexomys
 †Cimoliasaurus
  †Cimoliopterus
 †Cimoliopterus dunni – type locality for species
 †Cimolodon
 †Cimolodon electus – or unidentified comparable form
 †Cimolomys
 †Cimolomys clarki
 †Clevosaurus – or unidentified comparable form
  †Clidastes
 †Clidastes liodontus
 Cliona
 †Coahomasuchus – type locality for genus
 †Coahomasuchus kahleorum – type locality for species
 †Coelodus
  †Coelophysis
 †Coilopoceras
 †Coilopoceras springeri
  †Collignoniceras
 †Collignoniceras woollgari
 †Colognathus – type locality for genus
 †Coniasaurus
 †Continuoolithus
 †Conulus
 Corbicula
  Corbula
 †Coupatezia
 Crassostrea
 †Crenella
 †Crenella elegantula
 †Crenella serica
  †Cretolamna
 †Cretolamna appendiculata
 †Cretorectolobus
 †Cretorectolobus olsoni – or unidentified comparable form
  †Crosbysaurus – type locality for genus
 †Crosbysaurus harrisae – type locality for species
 Cucullaea
 †Cucullaea capax
 †Cucullaea powersi
 Cuspidaria
 †Cuspidaria ampulla
 †Cuspidaria grandis
 †Cuspidaria grovensis
 †Cyathophora
 †Cyclothyris
 Cylichna
 †Cylichna incisa
  †Cymatoceras
 †Cymella
 Cyzicus – tentative report
  †Dallasaurus – type locality for genus
 †Dallasaurus turneri – type locality for species
 Dasmosmilia
 †Dasmosmilia kochii – type locality for species
 Dasyatis
  †Deinosuchus
 †Deinosuchus riograndensis
 †Deinosuchus rugosus – type locality for species
 Dentalium
 †Dentalium leve
 †Dentalium pauperculum
  †Desmatosuchus
 †Desmatosuchus haplocerus
 †Desmatosuchus smalli – type locality for species
 †Desmatosuchus spurensis – type locality for species
  †Desmoceras
 Diodora – tentative report
 †Diphydontosaurus – or unidentified related form
 †Diploastrea
 Discorbis
 †Discoscaphites
 †Discoscaphites conradi
 †Dolichorhynchops
 †Dolichorhynchops bonneri
 †Doswellia
 †Douvilleiceras
 †Dreissena
  †Dromomeron
 †Dromomeron gregorii – type locality for species
 †Dryptosaurus
 †Dufrenoyia
 †Dufrenoyia justinae
 †Durania
 †Echinocorys
 †Ecphora
 †Ectenosaurus
  †Edmontonia – or unidentified comparable form
 †Elea – tentative report
  †Enchodus
 †Episcoposaurus – type locality for genus
 †Episcoposaurus haplocerus – type locality for species
 †Epitonium
 †Epitonium sillimani
  †Eubostrychoceras
 †Eucalycoceras
 †Eugyra
 †Euhoplites – tentative report
 †Eulima
 †Euomphaloceras
 †Eupachydiscus
 †Euspira
 †Eutrephoceras
 †Ewingia – type locality for genus
  †Exogyra
 †Exogyra cancellata
 †Exogyra costata
 †Fagesia
 †Faujasia
 †Favia
 †Flexomornis – type locality for genus
 †Flexomornis howei – type locality for species
 †Flickia
 †Forbesiceras
 †Forresteria
 Fusinus
 Galeorhinus
 Gastrochaena
 Gegania
 †Gervillia
 Ginglymostoma
  †Globidens
 †Globidens dakotensis
 Globigerina
 Glossus
 Glycymeris
 †Glycymeris rotundata
 †Glyptops – tentative report
 †Gobiates
 †Gryphaea
  †Gryposaurus – tentative report
 †Gypsichnites
 †Gyronchus
 Haminoea – tentative report
 †Hamites
 †Hamulus
 †Helicoceras
 †Helicoceras navarroense
 †Hemicalypterus – tentative report
  Heterodontus
 †Heteromorpha
 Hexanchus
  Homarus
 †Hoplochelys
 †Hoploscaphites
 †Hybodus
 †Hydnophora – tentative report
 †Hypophylloceras
 †Ichthyodectes
  †Ichthyornis
 †Ichthyornis dispar
 †Idoceras
 †Iguanodon – or unidentified comparable form
  †Inoceramus
 †Inoceramus anomalus – or unidentified comparable form
 †Inoceramus arnoldi
 †Inoceramus arvanus
 †Inoceramus balticus
 †Inoceramus cordiformis – or unidentified comparable form
 †Inoceramus deformis
 †Inoceramus dimidius
 †Inoceramus fragilis
 †Inoceramus prefragilis
 †Inoceramus vanuxemi – tentative report
 †Irenesauripus
 †Isastrea
 †Ischyrhiza
 †Ischyrhiza avonicola
 †Ischyrhiza mira
 †Jeletzkytes
 †Jeletzkytes brevis
 †Kamerunoceras
  †Koskinonodon – type locality for genus
 †Kritosaurus
 Lamna
 Latiaxis
  †Lepidotes
  Lepisosteus
 †Leptorhynchos – type locality for genus
 †Leptorhynchos gaddisi – type locality for species
 †Leptostyrax
  †Leptosuchus
 †Leptosuchus crosbiensis – type locality for species
 †Leptosuchus imperfecta – type locality for species
 †Leptosuchus studeri – type locality for species
 †Lewesiceras
 †Leyvachelys
 †Leyvachelys cipadi
 †Libognathus – type locality for genus
  †Libonectes
 †Libonectes morgani – type locality for species
 Lima
 Limatula
 †Linearis
 Lingula
 †Linter
 †Linthia
 Linuparus
 †Lioestheria – tentative report
 Liquidambar – tentative report
 †Lissodus
  †Lithacoceras
 Lithophaga
 †Lonchidion
  †Longosuchus
 †Longosuchus meadei – type locality for species
  Lopha
 †Lopha falcata
 †Lopha mesenterica
 †Lucasuchus – type locality for genus
 †Lucasuchus hunti – type locality for species
 Lucina
 †Macrepistius
 †Magnoavipes – type locality for genus
 †Malerisaurus
  †Mammites
 †Mantelliceras
 †Mantelliceras cantianum
 †Mariella
 †Mathilda
 Megalomphalus – or unidentified comparable form
 †Megalosauropus – tentative report
 Melanatria
 Membranipora
 †Meniscoessus
  †Menuites
 Mesalia
 †Mesodma
 †Metoicoceras
 †Metoicoceras geslinianum
  †Metoposaurus
 †Metoposaurus bakeri – type locality for species
 †Micraster
 †Modiolus
 †Modiolus sedesclaris
 †Modiolus sedesclarus
 Monodonta – tentative report
 †Monopleura – tentative report
 †Morea
 †Mortoniceras
  †Mosasaurus
 †Mosasaurus missouriensis – tentative report
 †Mytilus
 †Naomichelys
 Natica
 Nebrius
 †Neithea
 †Neithea bexarensis
 †Neithea quinquecostata
 †Neocardioceras
 †Neocardioceras juddii
  †Neohibolites
 †Neoptychites
 †Nerinea – tentative report
 Nerita
 Neritina
 †Nostoceras
 †Nostoceras approximans
 †Nostoceras splendidum
  Nucula
 †Nucula camia
 †Nucula cuneifrons
 †Nucula percrassa
 †Nyssa
 †Odaxosaurus
 †Odaxosaurus piger
 Odontaspis
 †Oklatheridium
 †Oklatheridium minax
 †Oklatheridium szalayi
  †Onchopristis
 †Onchosaurus
 †Ophiomorpha
 †Ophiopsis – tentative report
 †Opis
  †Ornithomimus
 †Ostlingoceras
 Ostrea
 †Otischalkia – type locality for genus
 †Otischalkia elderae – type locality for species
 †Oxyrhina
 †Pachycheilosuchus – type locality for genus
 †Pachycheilosuchus trinquei – type locality for species
 †Pachydesmoceras
 †Pachydiscus
  †Pachygenelus
 †Pachymelania
 Pagurus
 †Palaeobalistum
 †Palaeoctonus
  †Paleorhinus
 †Paleorhinus sawini – type locality for species
 †Paluxysaurus – type locality for genus. Now regarded as a junior synonym of Sauroposeidon.
 †Paluxysaurus jonesi – type locality for species. Now regarded as a junior synonym of Sauroposeidon proteles.
 †Paluxysuchus – type locality for genus
 †Paluxysuchus newmani – type locality for species
 †Panis
 Panopea
 †Pappotherium – type locality for genus
 †Paracimexomys
 †Paramicrodon – type locality for genus
 †Paranomia
  †Parapuzosia
 †Parasuchus
  †Paratypothorax
 †Paronychodon
 †Paronychodon lacustris – or unidentified comparable form
  †Pawpawsaurus – type locality for genus
 †Pawpawsaurus campbelli – type locality for species
 †Pecten
 †Pekinosaurus – or unidentified related form
 †Pekinosaurus olseni
 Perna – report made of unidentified related form or using admittedly obsolete nomenclature
 Pholadidea
  Pholadomya
 †Pholadomya occidentalis
 Pholas
 †Phymosoma
 †Phytosaurus
 †Pinna
 Pitar
 †Placenticeras
 †Placenticeras meeki
 †Planocephalosaurus
 †Platecarpus
 †Platecarpus planifrons
 †Platecarpus somenensis – or unidentified comparable form
 †Platecarpus tympaniticus
  †Platyceramus
 †Platyceramus cycloides
 †Platyceramus mantelli - or unidentified loosely related form
  †Platypterygius
 †Plesiosaurus
 Pleurotomaria
 †Plicatoscyllium – type locality for genus
 Plicatula
 †Plioplatecarpus – tentative report
 Polinices
 †Pollex
 †Polyptychodon
  †Poposaurus
 †Poposaurus gracilis
 †Porituberoolithus
  †Postosuchus – type locality for genus
 †Postosuchus kirkpatricki – type locality for species
 †Procardia
  †Prognathodon – tentative report
 †Promystriosuchus – type locality for genus
 †Prosiren – type locality for genus
 †Protecovasaurus – type locality for genus
 †Protecovasaurus lucasi – type locality for species
 †Protoavis – type locality for genus
 †Protoavis texensis – type locality for species
 †Protocardia
 †Protohadros – type locality for genus
 †Protohadros byrdi – type locality for species
  †Protosphyraena
 †Pseudocorax
 †Pseudomelania
 †Pseudoperna
 †Pseudoperna congesta
 †Pteranodon – or unidentified comparable form
 †Pteria
 †Pterotrigonia
 †Pterotrigonia eufalensis
 †Pterotrigonia eufaulensis
 †Ptychotrygon
 †Puzosia
 Pycnodonte
 †Pycnodonte belli
 †Pycnodonte mutabilis
 †Pycnodonte vesicularis
  †Quetzalcoatlus – type locality for genus
 †Quetzalcoatlus northropi – type locality for species
 †Quitmaniceras
 Raja
 †Rewaconodon – or unidentified related form
 †Rewaconodon tikiensis
  Rhinobatos
 †Rhombodus
  †Richardoestesia
 †Richardoestesia gilmorei
 †Richardoestesia isosceles – type locality for species
 †Rileymillerus – type locality for genus
 Ringicula
 †Ringicula pulchella
 Rogerella
 †Romaniceras
 Rostellaria – tentative report
 †Russellosaurus – type locality for genus
 †Russellosaurus coheni – type locality for species
  †Rutiodon
 †Sargana
  †Sauroposeidon
 †Sauroposeidon proteles
  †Saurornitholestes
 †Saurornitholestes langstoni – or unidentified comparable form
 †Sauvagesia – tentative report
 †Scapanorhynchus
 †Scapanorhynchus texanus
 †Scapherpeton
 †Scaphites
 †Scaphites hippocrepis - or unidentified loosely related form
 †Scaphites warreni
 †Schizobasis
 Scintilla – tentative report
 †Sclerorhynchus
  Scyliorhinus
 †Selaginella – or unidentified comparable form
 †Seminola – tentative report
 †Semionotus – or unidentified comparable form
 †Senis
 Serpula
  †Serratolamna
 †Serratolamna serrata
 †Sexta
  †Shuvosaurus – type locality for genus
 †Shuvosaurus inexpectatus – type locality for species
 †Siderastrea
 †Sierritasuchus – type locality for genus
 †Sierritasuchus macalpini – type locality for species
 †Skolithos
 Solemya
  †Sphenodiscus
 †Sphenodiscus lobatus
 †Sphenodiscus pleurisepta
 †Spinosuchus – type locality for genus
 †Spinosuchus caseanus – type locality for species
 †Spironema
  Spondylus
  Squalicorax
 †Squalicorax kaupi
 †Squalicorax pristodontus
 Squalus
 †Squatirhina
 †Squatirhina americana
  †Struthiomimus – or unidentified comparable form
 †Technosaurus – type locality for genus
 †Technosaurus smalli – type locality for species
 †Tecovasaurus – type locality for genus
 †Tecovasaurus murryi – type locality for species
 †Tecovasuchus – type locality for genus
 †Tecovasuchus chatterjeei – type locality for species
 Teinostoma
  Tellina
 †Tenea
  †Tenontosaurus
 †Tenontosaurus dossi – type locality for species
 Teredolites
 †Terlinguachelys – type locality for genus
 †Terlinguachelys fischbecki – type locality for species
  †Terminonaris
 †Terminonaris robusta – or unidentified comparable form
 †Texacephale – type locality for genus
 †Texacephale langstoni – type locality for species
 †Texasetes – type locality for genus
 †Texasetes pleurohalio – type locality for species
  Textularia
 †Thamnasteria
 †Thamnoseris – tentative report
 †Thomasites
 Trachycardium
 †Trachycardium eufaulensis
  †Triceratops
 †Trigonia
  †Trilophosaurus – type locality for genus
 †Trilophosaurus buettneri – type locality for species
 †Trilophosaurus jacobsi
 †Trinacromerum – type locality for genus
 †Trinacromerum bentonianum – type locality for species
 †Triodus
 †Triopticus – type locality for genus
 †Trochactaeon
 Tryonia
  †Turrilites
 †Turrilites acutus
  Turritella
 †Turritella bilira
 †Turritella forgemoli – or unidentified comparable form
 †Turritella hilgardi
 †Turritella paravertebroides
 †Turritella trilira
 †Turritella vertebroides
  †Tylosaurus
 †Tylosaurus kansasensis
 †Tylosaurus nepaeolicus
 †Tylosaurus proriger – or unidentified comparable form
 †Typothorax
  †Tyrannosaurus
 †Tyrannosaurus rex
 †Uktenadactylus
 Unio
 †Upogebia
 †Vancleavea
 †Vancleavea campi
 †Vascellum
 †Vascoceras
 Venericardia
 †Vinella
 Viviparus – tentative report
 Volsella
 Vulsella
  †Wannchampsus – type locality for genus
 †Wannia
 †Wannia scurriensis – type locality for species
 †Woodbinesuchus – type locality for genus
 †Woodbinesuchus byersmauricei – type locality for species
 †Wrightoceras
 Xanthosia
 †Xenacanthus – report made of unidentified related form or using admittedly obsolete nomenclature
 Xenophora
  †Xiphactinus
 †Yezoites
 Yoldia

Cenozoic

Selected Cenozoic taxa of Texas

 Abra
 Acanthocardia
 Acar
 Acirsa
 †Aclistomycter
 Acris
 †Acris crepitans
 Acteocina
 Acteon
 Admetula
 Adrana
 Aedes
  †Aelurodon
  †Aepycamelus
 Agaronia
 Agkistrodon
 †Agriocharis
 †Agriochoerus
 †Agriotherium
 †Aguascalientia
 Akera
 †Alforjas
 Aliculastrum
  †Allaeochelys – or unidentified comparable form
  Alligator
 †Alligator mississipiensis
 †Alligator mississippiensis
 †Alligator olseni
  †Allognathosuchus
 †Allomorone
 Alvania
 †Amblema
 †Amblema plicata
 †Ambystoma
 †Ambystoma tigrinum
 †Amebelodon
 †Ameiurus
 Amnicola
 †Amphicyon
 †Amphimachairodus
 Amphiuma
 †Ampullina
 Amusium
 Anadara
  †Anancus
 †Anchitheriomys
 †Anchitherium
 Ancilla
  †Angelarctocyon
 †Angelarctocyon australis – type locality for species
 †Annona
 Anodontia
 Anomia
 Antalis
 Anthonomus – tentative report
 Antillophos
 Antrozous
 †Antrozous pallidus
  †Aphelops
 †Aplexia
 Aplodinotus
 †Aplodinotus grunniens
 Aquila
 †Aquila chrysaetos
 Arca
 †Archaeohippus
  †Archaeotherium
 Architectonica
 †Arctocyon
  †Arctodus
 †Arctodus simus
 †Arctonasua
 Argobuccinum
 Argyrotheca
 Arius – or unidentified comparable form
 Arizona
 †Arizona elegans
 †Artocarpus
 Astarte
 Asthenotoma
 †Astrohippus
 Athleta
 Atlanta
 Atractosteus
 †Atractosteus spatula
 †Atractosteus tristoechus – tentative report
 Atrina
  †Aturia
 Atys
 †Australocamelus
 †Awateria
 Baiomys
 †Baiotomeus
 †Baiotomeus douglassi
 Balanophyllia
 Balanus
 †Baluchicardia
 Bankia
 Barbatia
  †Barbourofelis
 †Barbourofelis whitfordi
 Bassariscus
 †Bathygenys
 Bathytoma
 †Bathytoma nonplicata – or unidentified comparable form
 †Batrachosauroides
 Bela – report made of unidentified related form or using admittedly obsolete nomenclature
 †Belosaepia
 †Belosepia
 Bison
  †Bison antiquus
  †Bison latifrons
 Bittiolum – report made of unidentified related form or using admittedly obsolete nomenclature
 Bittium
 †Blancocamelus
 Blarina
 †Blarina brevicauda – or unidentified comparable form
 †Blastomeryx
  †Boavus – tentative report
 †Bonellitia
 †Borealosuchus
  †Borophagus
 †Borophagus diversidens
 †Borophagus hilli – type locality for species
 †Borophagus pugnator – or unidentified comparable form
 †Borophagus secundus
 †Boverisuchus
 †Boverisuchus vorax – or unidentified comparable form
 Brachidontes
 †Brachyhyops
 †Brachyrhynchocyon
 Bregmaceros
 †Bryozoan
 Bufo
  †Bufo cognatus
 †Bufo woodhousei
 Bulimulus
 †Bulimulus dealbatus
 Bullia
 Cadulus
 Caecum – or unidentified comparable form
 Caestocorbula
 †Calappilia
 †Calippus
 Callianassa
 Calyptraea
  †Camelops
 †Camelops hesternus – type locality for species
 †Camelops minidokae
 Cancellaria
 Candona
 Canis
 †Canis armbrusteri
  †Canis dirus
 †Canis edwardii
 †Canis latrans
 †Canis lepophagus – type locality for species
 Cantharus
  †Capromeryx
 Capulus
 Carapus
 Carcharhinus
 †Carpocyon
 Carychium
 †Carychium exiguum
 Caryophyllia
 Castor
 †Castor canadensis
 Catagonus
 †Caveola
 Celtis
 Centropomus – tentative report
  †Ceratogaulus
 †Ceratogaulus anecdotus – or unidentified comparable form
 †Cerdocyon
 Cerithiella
 Cerithiopsis
 Cerithium – tentative report
 Chaetodipus
 †Chaetodipus hispidus
 Chama
 Charina
 †Charophyte
  †Chasmaporthetes
 Chironomus
 Chlamys
 †Chriacus
 †Cimolodon
 Cirsotrema
 Cissus
  Clavilithes
 Clavus – tentative report
 Closia
 Clypeaster
 Cochlespira
 Cochliolepis
 †Colodon
 Coluber
  †Coluber constrictor
 Colubraria
 Columbella – report made of unidentified related form or using admittedly obsolete nomenclature
 †Colwellia
 †Combretum
 Cominella – or unidentified comparable form
 Conomitra
 Conus
 Corbicula
 Corbula
 †Cormohipparion
 †Corvina
 Corvus
 †Corvus brachyrhynchos
  †Coryphodon
  †Cranioceras
 Crassostrea
 †Crassostrea contracta
 Cratogeomys
 †Cratogeomys castanops
 Crenella
 †Cristellaria
 Crotalus
 †Crotalus atrox
 †Crotalus horridus
 Crotaphytus
  †Crotaphytus collaris
 †Crotaphytus reticulatus
 Cryptotis
 †Cryptotis parva
 Cucullaea
 Culex
 Cuna
 Cuspidaria
 †Cuspidaria grandis
  †Cuvieronius
 Cyclammina
 Cylichna
 †Cylindracanthus
 Cyllene – or unidentified comparable form
 †Cynarctoides
 †Cynarctus
 Cynomys
 †Cynomys ludovicianus
 Cypraea
 Cypraedia
 Cythara
 †Daphoenictis
  †Daphoenodon
 †Daphoenus
 †Daphoenus lambei – or unidentified comparable form
 Dasyatis
 Dasypus
 †Dasypus bellus
 Dentalium
 Dermatemys
 †Desmatippus
 †Diaphyodus
 †Dibelodon
  †Diceratherium
 Didelphis
 †Didelphis marsupialis
 †Dinofelis
 †Dinohippus
  †Dinohyus
 †Dinohyus hollandi
 Diplotaxis – or unidentified comparable form
 Dipodomys
 †Dipodomys merriami
 †Dipodomys ordii
 †Dipodomys spectabilis
 †Discradisca
 Disonycha
 †Dolicholatirus
 Dorsanum
  †Duchesneodus
 †Echmatemys
 Elaphe
 †Elaphe guttata
 †Elaphe obsoleta
 Eleutherodactylus
 †Eleutherodactylus augusti
  †Ellisella
 Emarginula – or unidentified comparable form
 Endochironomus
 †Eomellivora
 †Eosurcula
 Epicauta
  †Epicyon
 †Epicyon haydeni
 †Epihippus
 Epitonium
 Eptesicus
 †Eptesicus fuscus
 Equus
 †Equus alaskae – or unidentified comparable form
 †Equus conversidens
 †Equus francisci – type locality for species
 †Equus giganteus
 †Equus idahoensis
 †Equus scotti – type locality for species
 †Equus semiplicatus
  †Equus simplicidens
 Erethizon
 †Erethizon dorsatum
  †Eucyon
 †Eucyon davisi
 Eulima
 Eumeces
 †Eumeces fasciatus
 †Eumeces obsoletus
 †Euonymus
 Eupleura
  Euspira
 †Eutrephoceras
 †Exilia
 Fasciolaria – tentative report
 Felis
 †Ficopsis
  Ficus
 Flabellum
 †Floridachoerus – tentative report
 †Floridatragulus
 Formica
 Fossaria
 Fulgurofusus
 †Fusconaia
 Fusinus
 Fustiaria
 Gadila
 Galeocerdo
 Galeodea
 Gastrocopta
 †Gastrocopta armifera
 †Gastrocopta contracta
 †Gastrocopta pellucida
 †Gastrocopta pentodon
  †Gavialosuchus
 Gegania
 Geochelone
 Geomys
 †Geomys bursarius
 †Gigantocamelus
  †Glossotherium
 Glycymeris
 Glyptoactis
  †Glyptodon
 †Glyptotherium
 †Glyptotherium texanum
 Glyptozaria
 †Gnathabelodon
  †Gomphotherium
 †Goniobasis
 Gopherus – type locality for genus
 †Gopherus polyphemus – type locality for species
 Graptemys
 †Graptemys geographica
 Gregariella
 †Gulfoceras
 †Gustafsonia
 Guttulina
 Gyraulus
 †Gyraulus parvus
 †Hadrianus
  †Haplohippus
 Harpa
  †Harpactocarcinus
 †Harpagolestes
 Hastula
 Haustator
 Hawaiia
 †Hawaiia minuscula
  †Hayoceros
 Helicina
 †Helicina orbiculata
 Helicodiscus
 †Helicodiscus parallelus
 Helisoma
 †Helisoma anceps
 †Helisoma trivolvis
 Heloderma
 †Hemiauchenia
 †Hemiauchenia macrocephala
 †Herpetotherium
 †Hesperotestudo
 †Heteraletes
 Heterodon
  †Heterodon nasicus – or unidentified comparable form
 †Heterodon platyrhinos – or unidentified comparable form
 †Heteromeryx
 Hexaplex
 †Hipparion
 †Hippidion
 Hippodamia
 †Hippodamia convergens – tentative report
 Hipponix
 †Hippotherium
 Holbrookia
  †Holmesina
  †Homotherium
 †Homotherium serum
  †Hyaenodon
 †Hyaenodon crucians
 †Hyaenodon horridus – or unidentified comparable form
 †Hyaenodon montanus
 †Hyaenodon raineyi
 †Hyaenodon vetus – or unidentified comparable form
 Hyla
 †Hyopsodus
 Hyotissa
 †Hypertragulus
 †Hypohippus
 †Hypolagus
 †Hyrachyus
 †Hyracodon
 †Hyracotherium
 †Hyracotherium vasacciense
 Ictalurus
 †Ictalurus punctatus
 †Ictiobus
  †Indarctos
 †Inga
 †Ischyrocyon
 †Ischyromys
 Isognomon
 †Jefitchia – type locality for genus
 Juglans
  †Kalobatippus
 Kinosternon
 †Kinosternon flavescens
 Kuphus
 †Lacunaria
 †Lambdoceras
 †Lambertocyon
 †Lambertocyon eximius
  Lampropeltis
 †Lampropeltis getulus
 †Lampropeltis triangulum
 Lasionycteris
 †Lasionycteris noctivagans
 Lasiurus
 †Lasiurus borealis
 Latirus
 †Ledina
 †Leea
 Lepisosteus
 †Lepisosteus spatula – or unidentified comparable form
 Lepomis
 †Lepomis cyanellus – or unidentified comparable form
  †Leptictis
  †Leptocyon
 †Leptoreodon
 Lepus
 †Lepus californicus
 Limacina
 Limaria
 †Limnenetes
 †Linthia
 Lithophaga
 Litiopa
 Littorina
 †Longirostromeryx
  Lovenia
 Lucina
 Lunatia – report made of unidentified related form or using admittedly obsolete nomenclature
 Lunularia – tentative report
 Lymnaea
 Lynx
 †Lynx rufus
 Lyria
 Lytta
  †Machairodus
 Macrocallista
 Mactra
 Madrepora
 Magnolia
 †Mahgarita
 †Mammut
 †Mammut americanum
 †Mammuthus
  †Mammuthus columbi
 Marginella
 Marmota
 †Marmota flaviventris
 Martes
 Martesia
 †Mathilda – tentative report
 †Mathilda – or unidentified comparable form
 †Mathilda
 †Mauricia
 †Megalictis – tentative report
 †Megalonyx
 †Megalonyx jeffersonii – or unidentified comparable form
 †Megalonyx leptostomus
  †Megatherium
 †Megatylopus
 Melanella
 †Menetus
  †Menoceras
 †Menops
 Mephitis
 †Mephitis mephitis
 Meretrix
 †Merychippus
 †Merychippus sejunctus
 †Merychyus
  †Merycoidodon
 Mesalia
 †Mescalerolemur – type locality for genus
 †Mescalerolemur horneri – type locality for species
 Mesodesma
 †Mesodma
 †Mesodma pygmaea – or unidentified comparable form
 †Mesodma thompsoni
 †Mesohippus
 †Metalopex
  †Metamynodon
 Metula
 †Michela
 †Michenia
 Microdrillia
 Micropterus
 †Microsyops
 †Microtomarctus
 Microtus
 †Microtus mexicanus
 †Microtus pennsylvanicus
 †Microtus pinetorum
 Micrurus
 †Micrurus fulvius
 †Mimetodon
 †Miocyon
  †Miohippus
  †Miracinonyx
 †Miracinonyx inexpectatus – or unidentified comparable form
 †Miracinonyx studeri
 Mitrella
 Modiolus – tentative report
  †Moropus
 †Morrillia
 Murex
 Mustela
 †Mustela vison
 Myctophum
 Myliobatis
 †Mylohyus
 †Mylohyus fossilis
 Myotis
 †Myotis lucifugus
 †Myotis velifer
 Mytilus
 Myzinum – or unidentified comparable form
  †Nannippus
 †Nanotragulus
 Narona
 Nassarius
  Nasua
 Natica
 Naticarius
 Natrix
 †Natrix erythrogaster
 Nectandra
 †Neochoerus – type locality for genus
 †Neochoerus pinckneyi
 Neofiber
  †Neohipparion
 Neotamias
 †Neotamias cinereicollis
 Neotoma
 †Neotoma albigula
 †Neotoma floridana
 †Neotoma mexicana
 †Neotoma micropus
 Neptunea – report made of unidentified related form or using admittedly obsolete nomenclature
 Nerodia
 †Nerodia fasciata
 Neverita
 †Nexuotapirus
  †Nimravides
 Niptus
 Norrisia
 †Notharctus
 †Notharctus tenebrosus
 †Nothokemas
  †Nothrotheriops
 †Nothrotherium
 Notiosorex
 †Notiosorex crawfordi
 †Notiotitanops
 Notophthalmus
 Nucula
 Nysius – tentative report
 Oculina
 Odocoileus
  †Odocoileus virginianus
  Odontaspis
 Odostomia
 Olivella
 Ondatra
 †Ondatra zibethicus
 Onychomys
 †Onychomys leucogaster
 †Onychomys torridus
 Opalia
 Opheodrys
 †Opheodrys aestivus
 Ophisaurus
 †Oreodaphne
 Oryzomys
 †Oryzomys palustris
  †Osbornoceros – tentative report
 Ostrea
 Ovis
 †Ovis canadensis
 †Oxydactylus
 †Pachecoa
 †Palaeolama
 †Palaeophis
 Panopea
 Panthera
  †Panthera leo
 †Panthera onca
 †Paraenhydrocyon
 †Parahippus
 †Parahippus leonensis – type locality for species
 †Paralbula
  †Paramylodon
 †Paramylodon harlani
 †Paramys
 †Paratoceras
 †Paratomarctus
 †Parectypodus
 †Parectypodus sloani
 †Paronychomys – tentative report
 †Parvitragulus
 †Pediomeryx
  †Peltosaurus – tentative report
 †Peraceras
 †Peratherium
 Perognathus
 †Perognathus flavus
 Peromyscus
 †Peromyscus boylii
 †Peromyscus difficilis
  †Peromyscus eremicus
 †Peromyscus gossypinus
 †Peromyscus leucopus
 †Peromyscus maniculatus
 †Peromyscus pectoralis
 Phaedon – or unidentified comparable form
 Phalium
 †Phenacodus
 Philine
  †Phlaocyon
 †Phlaocyon annectens
 †Phlaocyon minor
 Pholadomya
 Pholas
 Phos
 Phrynosoma
  †Phrynosoma cornutum
 Phyllodus
 Physa
 Pinna – tentative report
 Pisidium
 †Pisidium nitidum
 Pitar
 Pituophis
 †Pituophis melanoleucus
 Planorbis
  †Platygonus
 †Platygonus compressus
 †Pleiolama
 †Plesiocolopirus
 †Plesiogulo
 Pleurocera
 Pleurofusia
 Pleuromeris
 Pleuroploca
 †Pleurostoma
 Pleurotomella
 Plicatula
  †Pliohippus
 †Pliometanastes
 †Poabromylus
 Podomys
 †Poebrotherium
 Polinices
 Polydora
 Polygyra
 Polyschides
 Porites
 †Potamides
 †Priscocamelus
 †Pristichampsus
 Pristis
  †Procamelus
 †Procamelus leptognathus
 †Procamelus occidentalis
 †Procastoroides
 †Procynodictis
 Procyon
 †Procyon lotor
 †Prohesperocyon
 †Prohesperocyon wilsoni
 Propeamussium
 †Prosimnia
 †Prosynthetoceras
 †Protitanotherium
  †Protoceras – tentative report
 †Protohippus
 †Protolabis
 †Protylopus – tentative report
 Pseudacris
 †Pseudacris ocularis
 †Pseudacris streckeri
  †Pseudaelurus – tentative report
 †Pseudhipparion
 Pseudochama
 Pseudoliva
 †Pseudoprotoceras
  †Psittacotherium
 Pteria
 Pteris
 Pterothrissus
 Pterynotus
  †Ptilodus
 †Ptilodus mediaevus
 Ptinus
 Puma
 †Puma concolor
 Pupilla
 †Pupilla blandi
 Pupoides
 Pycnodonte
 †Pylodictis
 †Pylodictis olivaris
 Pyramidella
 †Quadrula
 Quinqueloculina
 †Raja
 †Raja texana – type locality for species
 †Rana
  †Rana catesbiana – lapsus calami of Rana catesbeiana
 †Rana pipiens
 Ranularia
 Raphitoma
 Reithrodontomys
 †Reithrodontomys fulvescens
 †Reithrodontomys megalotis
 †Reithrodontomys montanus
 †Retinella
  Retusa
 Rhinobatos
 Rhinocheilus
 †Rhinocheilus lecontei
 Rhinoptera
  †Rhynchotherium – tentative report
 Rimella
 Ringicula
 †Rooneyia – type locality for genus
 †Rooneyia viejaensis – type locality for species
 †Rotalia
 †Rotularia
 Salvadora
 †Sapindus
 Sassia
 Scalopus
 †Scalopus aquaticus
 Scaphander
 Scaphella
  Scaphiopus
 †Scaphites
 Sceloporus
 †Sceloporus olivaceus
 †Sceloporus undulatus
 Sciurus
  †Sciurus carolinensis
 †Sciurus niger
 †Selaginella
 Selenophorus – or unidentified comparable form
 Semele
 Serpulorbis
 Sigatica
 Sigmodon
  †Sigmodon hispidus
 Siliqua
 Simnia
  †Sinopa
 Sinum
 Siphonalia
 Siren
 †Siren miotexana – type locality for species
 Skena
 Skenea
  †Smilodon
 †Smilodon fatalis
 †Soergelia
 †Soergelia mayfieldi
 Solariella
 Solemya
 Solen
 †Sophora
 Sorex
 †Sorex cinereus
 †Sorex palustris
 †Sorex vagrans
 Spermophilus
 †Spermophilus elegans – or unidentified comparable form
  †Spermophilus spilosoma
  †Spermophilus tridecemlineatus
 †Spermophilus variegatus
 Sphaerium
 Spilogale
 †Spilogale putorius
 Spirorbis
 Spirotropis
 Spisula
 Stagnicola
 †Stagnicola reflexa
  †Stegomastodon
 †Stegomastodon mirificus
 †Steneofiber
 †Stenomylus
 †Stenotrema
 Sternotherus
 Sthenictis
  †Stockoceros – or unidentified comparable form
 Storeria
 †Storeria dekayi
 †Striatolamia
 Strobilops
 †Stygimys
  †Stylinodon
 Succinea
 Sylvilagus
 †Sylvilagus audubonii
 †Sylvilagus floridanus
 Synaptomys
 †Synaptomys cooperi
  †Synthetoceras
 †Synthetoceras tricornatus – type locality for species
 Syrphus – or unidentified comparable form
 Tantilla
 Tanytarsus – tentative report
  Tapirus
 †Tapirus veroensis
 Taxidea
 †Taxidea taxus
 Teinostoma
  †Teleoceras
 †Teleoceras major
 Tellina
 Tenagodus
 †Tephrocyon
 Terebellum
 Terebra
 Teredo
 Terminalia
 Terrapene
  †Terrapene carolina
 †Terrapene ornata
 Testudo
  †Tetrameryx
 Thamnophis
 †Thamnophis proximus
 †Thamnophis sauritus
 †Thamnophis sirtalis
 Theodoxus
 †Thinobadistes
 Thomomys
 †Thomomys bottae
 †Thomomys talpoides – or unidentified comparable form
 †Ticholeptus
  †Titanoides
 †Titanoides gidleyi – or unidentified comparable form
 †Tomarctus
 †Tomarctus brevirostris
 †Toromeryx
  †Trigonias – tentative report
 Trigonostoma
 †Trinacria
 †Tripia
 Trochita
 Tropidoclonion
 †Tropidoclonion lineatum
 †Truncilla
 †Truncilla truncata
 †Trygon
 †Tuba
 Tucetona
 Turbonilla
 Turricula
 Turris
 Turritella
  Tympanuchus
 Typhina
 Tyto
 †Tyto alba
  †Uintatherium – or unidentified comparable form
 †Uintatherium anceps
 Umbraculum
 Unio
 Urocyon
 †Urocyon cinereoargenteus – or unidentified comparable form
 Ursus
 †Ursus americanus
 †Ustatochoerus
 Vallonia
 †Vallonia gracilicosta
 †Vallonia parvula
 Venericardia
 Verticordia
 Vertigo
 †Vertigo ovata
 †Viridomys
 †Volvariella
 Vulpes
 †Vulpes velox
  †Vulpes vulpes
  †Xenocyon
 Xenophora
 Yoldia
 †Yumaceras
 Zonitoides
 †Zonitoides arboreus

References
 

Texas
Texas-related lists